Vidmantas Mališauskas (born 4 August 1963) is a Lithuanian chess Grandmaster (1993).

Chess career
He won the Lithuanian Chess Championship on six occasions: in 1987, 1989, 1990, 1998 (shared with Šarūnas Šulskis), 2003 and 2006. Played for Lithuania in the Chess Olympiads of 1992, 1994, 1996, 1998, 2002, 2006 and in the European Team Chess Championships of 1992 and 2007. Other notable results include 2nd (behind Maxim Matlakov) in the Gipslis Memorial 2009 and 2nd (behind Vadim Shishkin) in the Lubawka Gate Open 2009.

Chess strength
According to Chessmetrics, at his peak in May 1993 Mališauskas's play was equivalent to a rating of 2666, and he was ranked number 49 in the world. His best single performance was at POL-chT Bydgoszcz, 1990, where he scored 6 of 6 possible points (100%) against 2472-rated opposition, for a performance rating of 2671.

In the November 2009 FIDE list, he has an Elo rating of 2483, making him Lithuania's number six.

Family
His wife is Lithaunian chess master Marina Mališauskienė.

Notable games
Vidmantas Malisauskas vs Viktor Kupreichik, Warsaw 1990, Sicilian Defense: Najdorf Variation (B94), 1-0
Vidmantas Malisauskas vs Zigurd Lanka, Vilnius 1993, Sicilian Defense: Richter-Rauzer (B62), 1-0
Vidmantas Malisauskas vs Alexey Shirov, It (cat.13) (active) 1996, Sicilian Defense: Richter-Rauzer (B62), 1-0
Joel Benjamin vs Vidmantas Malisauskas, Bled Olympiad 2002, Sicilian Defense: Najdorf Variation (B90), 0-1

References

External links

Vidmantas Mališauskas at 365Chess.com
Chessmetrics Player Profile: Vidmantas Malisauskas

1963 births
Living people
Chess grandmasters
Lithuanian chess players